The Curone  (in Piedmontese and in Lombard Cròu) is a torrent which flows for some 50 km) through the Italian regions Lombardy and Piedmont. It is a right tributary of the river Po.

The source of the river is at an elevation of some 1,500 m on Monte Garavè and close to the border between Piedmont and Lombardy.

References

Rivers of the Province of Alessandria
Rivers of the Province of Pavia
Rivers of Italy